Eric Correa Rivera (born April 5, 1975) is a Puerto Rican politician affiliated with the New Progressive Party (PNP). Previously he has served as a member of the Puerto Rico House of Representatives representing District 38.

Early years and studies

Eric Correa Rivera was born on April 5, 1975. He was raised in Carolina, where he completed his elementary and high school. He graduated from the Angel P. Millán High School.

Correa later enrolled at the University of Turabo to obtain a Bachelor's degree in Mechanical Engineering.

Political career

In 2001, Correa decided to enter active politics and ran for President of the New Progressive Party in his Precinct (106, Carolina). However, after being elected at the 2003 PNP primaries to run for the House of Representatives of Puerto Rico, he was defeated at the general election the next year.

After winning again on the 2008 primaries, Correa campaigned again for the House of Representatives, and was elected at the general election.

After just one term at the House, Correa was not reelected in 2012.

References

External links
Eric Correa Official biography

Living people
1975 births
Members of the Senate of Puerto Rico
New Progressive Party members of the House of Representatives of Puerto Rico